Johan Ernst Berg (19 October 1768 – 15 October 1828) was a Norwegian jurist, politician, and civil servant.

Berg was born on the Blussuvoll farm in the parish of Strinda in Søndre Trøndhjems amt, Norway. He was the son of a farmer Haaken Larsen Blussuvolden.

He graduated as a lawyer in 1795 and became an agent with the Danish general post in 1802.  In 1803, he became bailiff in the Salten district of Nordland county. In 1815, he was appointed to the post of County Governor of Nordlands amt. During his time in office, he was also elected to the Norwegian Parliament in 1815-1817 and 1826, representing the county in which he lived.  During his time as governor, the diplomatic scandal known as the Bodø affair took place.  He held the post of county governor until his death in 1828.

References

1768 births
1828 deaths
Members of the Storting
County governors of Norway
County governors of Nordland
Nordland politicians
18th-century Norwegian lawyers